Oligodendrocytes, or oligodendroglia, are a type of neuroglia whose main functions are to provide support and insulation to axons in the central nervous system of jawed vertebrates, equivalent to the function performed by Schwann cells in the peripheral nervous system. Oligodendrocytes do this by creating the myelin sheath. A single oligodendrocyte can extend its processes to 50 axons, wrapping approximately 1 μm of myelin sheath around each axon; Schwann cells, on the other hand, can wrap around only one axon. Each oligodendrocyte forms one segment of myelin for several adjacent axons.

Oligodendrocytes are found only in the central nervous system, which comprises the brain and spinal cord.  These cells were originally thought to have been produced in the ventral neural tube; however, research now shows oligodendrocytes originate from the ventral ventricular zone of the embryonic spinal cord and possibly have some concentrations in the forebrain. They are the last cell type to be generated in the central nervous system (CNS). Oligodendrocytes were discovered by Pío del Río Hortega.

Classification
Oligodendrocytes are a type of glial cell. They arise during development from oligodendrocyte precursor cells (OPCs), which can be identified by their expression of a number of antigens, including the ganglioside GD3, the NG2 chondroitin sulfate proteoglycan, and the platelet-derived growth factor-alpha receptor subunit (PDGF-alphaR). Mature oligodendrocytes are broadly classified into either myelinating or non-myelinating satellite oligodendrocytes. Precursors and both mature types are typically identified by their expression of the transcription factor OLIG2.

Development
Most oligodendrocytes develop during embryogenesis and early postnatal life from restricted periventricular germinal regions. Oligodendrocyte formation in the adult brain is associated with glial-restricted progenitor cells, known as oligodendrocyte progenitor cells (OPCs). SVZ cells migrate away from germinal zones to populate both developing white and gray matter, where they differentiate and mature into myelin-forming oligodendrocytes. However, it is not clear whether all oligodendrocyte progenitors undergo this sequence of events.

Between midgestation and term birth in human cerebral white matter, three successive stages of the classic human oligodendrocyte lineage are found: OPCs, immature oligodendrocytes (non-myelinating), and mature oligodendrocytes (myelinating). It has been suggested that some undergo apoptosis and others fail to differentiate into mature oligodendrocytes but persist as adult OPCs. Remarkably, oligodendrocyte population originated in the subventricular zone can be dramatically expanded by administering epidermal growth factor (EGF).

Function

Myelination

Mammalian nervous systems depend crucially on myelin sheaths, which reduce ion leakage and decrease the capacitance of the cell membrane, for rapid signal conduction. Myelin also increases impulse speed, as saltatory propagation of action potentials occurs at the nodes of Ranvier in between Schwann cells (of the PNS) and oligodendrocytes (of the CNS).  Furthermore, impulse speed of myelinated axons increases linearly with the axon diameter, whereas the impulse speed of unmyelinated cells increases only with the square root of the diameter. The insulation must be proportional to the diameter of the fibre inside. The optimal ratio of axon diameter divided by the total fiber diameter (which includes the myelin) is 0.6.

Myelination is only prevalent in a few brain regions at birth and continues into adulthood. The entire process is not complete until about 25–30 years of age. Myelination is an important component of intelligence, and white matter quantity may be positively correlated with IQ test results in children. Rats that were raised in an enriched environment, which is known to increase cognitive flexibility, had more myelination in their corpus callosi.

Metabolic support
Oligodendrocytes interact closely with nerve cells and provide trophic support by the production of glial cell line-derived neurotrophic factor (GDNF), brain-derived neurotrophic factor (BDNF), or insulin-like growth factor-1 (IGF-1). They may also directly provide metabolites to neurons, as described by the lactate shuttle hypothesis.

It is hypothesized that satellite oligodendrocytes (or perineuronal oligodendrocytes) are functionally distinct from other oligodendrocytes. They are not attached to neurons via myelin sheaths and, therefore, do not contribute to insulation. They remain opposed to neurons and regulate the extracellular fluid. Satellite oligodendrocytes are considered to be a part of the grey matter whereas myelinating oligodendrocytes are a part of the white matter. They may support neuronal metabolism. Satellite oligodendrocytes may be recruited to produce new myelin after a demyelinating injury.

Clinical significance

Diseases that result in injury to oligodendrocytes include demyelinating diseases such as multiple sclerosis and various leukodystrophies. Trauma to the body, e.g. spinal cord injury, can also cause demyelination. The immature oligodendrocytes, which increase in number during mid-gestation, are more vulnerable to hypoxic injury and are involved in  periventricular leukomalacia. This largely congenital condition of damage to the newly forming brain can therefore lead to cerebral palsy. In cerebral palsy, spinal cord injury, stroke and possibly multiple sclerosis, oligodendrocytes are thought to be damaged by excessive release of the neurotransmitter, glutamate. Damage has also been shown to be mediated by N-methyl-D-aspartate receptors. Oligodendrocyte dysfunction may also be implicated in the pathophysiology of schizophrenia and bipolar disorder.

Oligodendrocytes are also susceptible to infection by the JC virus, which causes progressive multifocal leukoencephalopathy (PML), a condition that specifically affects white matter, typically in immunocompromised patients.  Tumors of oligodendrocytes are called oligodendrogliomas. The chemotherapy agent Fluorouracil (5-FU) causes damage to the oligodendrocytes in mice, leading to both acute central nervous system (CNS) damage and progressively worsening delayed degeneration of the CNS.

See also 
White matter
Schwann cells
2',3'-Cyclic-nucleotide 3'-phosphodiesterase (CNPase)
List of human cell types derived from the germ layers

References 

Bibliography

Raine, C.S. (1991). Oligodendrocytes and central nervous system myelin. In Textbook of Neuropathology, second edition, R.L. Davis and D.M. Robertson, eds. (Baltimore, Maryland: Williams and Wilkins), pp. 115–141.

External links
 The Department of Neuroscience at Wikiversity
 NIF Search – Oligodendrocyte via the Neuroscience Information Framework

Glial cells
Biology of bipolar disorder